Pital is a district of the San Carlos canton, in the Alajuela province of Costa Rica.

History 
Pital was created on 5 November 1948 by Decreto 36.

Geography 
Pital has an area of  km² which makes it the third district of the canton by area and an elevation of  metres.

It is located in the northern region of the country and borders with 3 districts; Venice to the south, Cutris and Aguas Zarcas to the west. While to the north it borders with Nicaragua and to the east with the province of Heredia.

Its head, the city of Pital, is located 28.6 km (50 minutes) NE of Quesada (Costa Rica) and 91.9 km (2 hours 30 minutes) to NW of San José the capital of the nation.

It is located at an elevation of 100 meters above sea level.

It is located at low altitude, because much of the district is located in the plains of San Carlos.

Demographics 

For the 2011 census, Pital had a population of  inhabitants. 

It is the third most populated of the canton, only behind Quesada and Aguas Zarcas, but surpassing to La Fortuna and Florencia.

Transportation

Road transportation 
The district is covered by the following road routes:
 National Route 4
 National Route 250
 National Route 744
 National Route 745
 National Route 746

Settlements
The 18 population centers of the district are:

Pital (head of the district)
Piedra Alegre
El Encanto
Los Ángeles
Veracruz
Chaparrón
El Palmar
Golfito
Cuatro Esquinas
La Josefina
Puerto Escondido
Yucatán
Tierras Buenas
Coopeisabel
Santa Elena
El Saíno
La Trinchera
San Marcos

Economy 

The economy is based on the extensive cultivation of pineapple for export purposes.

Livestock meat and milk also has great relevance in the area, as currently Pital
Is the second district that produces more milk in the canton.

Pital center, has health services, educational, financial, food and some places of accommodation.

The trade is represented by supermarkets, shops and premises in which the sale of fast food, groceries, shoes, clothes and appliances and accessories in general stands out.

References 

Districts of Alajuela Province
Populated places in Alajuela Province